Frenulinidae is a family of brachiopods belonging to the order Terebratulida.

Genera:
 Compsoria Cooper, 1973
 Frenulina Dall, 1895
 Jolonica Dall, 1920
 Pictothyris Thomson, 1927
 Shimodaia MacKinnon, Saito & Endo, 1997

References

Brachiopods